Columnea orientandina is a plant species from Ecuador. It has leaves which are mostly green with a red coloured tip.

References

orientandina
Flora of Ecuador